"Miyako Hideaway" is the first single released by Marion from their second album The Program, reaching number 45 in the UK Singles Chart.

Track listing
All tracks by Harding/Grantham/Cunningham, except where indicated. All words by Harding.

7" vinyl
 "Miyako Hideaway (Radio edit)" (Harding/Grantham/Cunningham/Marr)
 "Speechless"

CD1
 "Miyako Hideaway (Radio edit)" (Harding/Grantham/Cunningham/Marr)
 "Speechless"
 "We Love Everything"

CD2
 "Miyako Hideaway (Full Length edit)" (Harding/Grantham/Cunningham/Marr)
 "Minus You"
 "Promise Q" (Grantham/Cunningham/Marr)

Personnel 

 Jaime Harding - vocals
 Tony Grantham - guitar
 Phil Cunningham - guitar
 Nick Gilbert - bass
 Murad Mousa - drums
 Johnny Marr - guitar/keyboards
 Ged Lynch - percussion

Marion (band) songs
1998 songs
London Records singles
Songs written by Johnny Marr
Songs written by Phil Cunningham (rock musician)
Songs written by Jaime Harding